Yulan may refer to

Places
Yulan, New York, a community and census tract in the United States
 Yulan, Dongkou (毓兰镇), a town of Dongkou County, Hunan, China

Chinese names
Gao Yulan (born 1982), Chinese rower
Hu Yulan, Chinese tennis player
Ni Yulan (born 1960), Chinese civil rights lawyer

Other uses
Yulan Festival or Ghost Festival, a traditional Chinese festival
Taiping Yulan, a Chinese encyclopedia